Kohat Subdivision formerly Frontier Region Kohat is a subdivision in Khyber Pakhtunkhwa province of Pakistan. The region is located adjacent to the Kohat District, and therefore derives its name from Kohat. Kohat subdivision also shares its boundary with Peshawar District to the north, Nowshera District to the east and Orakzai Agency to the west. It is administered under the overall supervision and administrative command of Deputy Commissioner (DC) Kohat. The main towns in Kohat subdivision is Darra Adam Khel and Jawaki Adam Khel.

The population in 1998 was  persons, 98.6% of whom had Pashto as their first language.

Geography and climate

The climate of Kohat and surroundings is hot from May to September. June is the hottest month. The mean, maximum and minimum temperature recorded during June is about 40 °C and 27 °C respectively. A pleasant change in the weather is noted from October onwards, up till February. The winter is cold and severe. In winter a wrong west wind known as “Hangu Breeze” often blows down the Miranzai valley towards Kohat for weeks. The mean maximum and minimum temperature, recorded during the month of January, is about 18 °C and 6 °C respectively.

The rainfall is received throughout the year. The monsoon rain is received from May to October.  August is the rainiest month, with an average of about 114 mm. The winter rain occurs from November to April.  The highest winter rainfall is received in the month of March.  The average annual rainfall is about 638 mm. The maximum humidity has been recorded in the month of August during summer season and in December during the winter season.

Education
According to the Alif Ailaan Pakistan District Education Rankings 2015, FR Kohat in terms of facilities and infrastructure, the district is ranked 74 out of 148.

See also
 Federally Administered Tribal Areas
 Kohat District

References

External links
 Government of the Federally Administered Tribal Areas
 Pakistani Federal Ministry of States and Frontier Regions

Durand Line
Frontier Regions
Frontier|Frontier